Longxu District is a district of the prefecture-level city of Wuzhou in Guangxi Zhuang Autonomous Region, China. It was created in March 2013 by splitting off four towns from Cangwu County. It is named after the district seat Longxu Town, which was formerly the seat of Cangwu County. Cangwu's seat was moved to Shiqiao Town after the reorganization.

Administrative divisions
Longxu District is divided into four towns: Longxu (龙圩), Xindi (新地), Guangping (广平), and Dapo (大坡).

References

County-level divisions of Guangxi
2013 establishments in China
Wuzhou